Lakhdar Adjali (born July 18, 1972 in Algiers) is an Algerian football manager and former player who most recently was the head coach of NA Hussein Dey.

Clubs
 1991–1994 NA Hussein Dey 
 1994–1997 Amiens SC 
 1997–1999 FC Martigues 
 1999–1999 FC Sion 
 1999–2000 ES Wasquehal 
 2000–2000 Brentford FC 
 2000–2002 Amiens SC 
 2002–2003 Al-Rayyan SC 
 2003–2004 RC Kouba

Honours
 Finalist in the 2001 Coupe de France with Amiens SC
 Participated in the 1998 African Cup of Nations in Burkina Faso
 Has 22 caps for the Algerian national team

References

External links
Lakhdar Adjali at Footballdatabase

1972 births
1998 African Cup of Nations players
Algeria international footballers
Algeria youth international footballers
Algeria under-23 international footballers
Algerian expatriate sportspeople in Qatar
Algerian expatriate sportspeople in England
Algerian expatriate sportspeople in Switzerland
Algerian expatriate sportspeople in France
Algerian footballers
Amiens SC players
Expatriate footballers in England
Expatriate footballers in Switzerland
Expatriate footballers in France
Expatriate footballers in Qatar
Living people
Footballers from Algiers
FC Sion players
FC Martigues players
Ligue 1 players
Ligue 2 players
NA Hussein Dey players
Al-Rayyan SC players
RC Kouba players
Brentford F.C. players
Qatar Stars League players
Competitors at the 1993 Mediterranean Games
Mediterranean Games silver medalists for Algeria
Association football midfielders
Mediterranean Games medalists in football
Wasquehal Football players
21st-century Algerian people